Masoko may refer to:
 Masoko, Ward, Rungwe District, Mbeya Region, Tanzania
 Kilwa Masoko, the administrative center of Kilwa District, Lindi Region, Tanzania